Francis V, Duke of Modena, Reggio and Guastalla, Archduke of Austria-Este, Royal Prince of Hungary and Bohemia, Duke of Mirandola and of Massa, Prince of Carrara (1 June 1819 – 20 November 1875) was a reigning prince. He was Duke of Modena, Reggio, and Mirandola, Duke of Guastalla from 1847 and Duke of Massa and Prince of Carrara from 1846 to 1859. His parents were Francis IV of Modena and Princess Maria Beatrice of Savoy. He was the last reigning Duke of Modena before the duchy was incorporated into the Kingdom of Italy.

Life and legacy

Francis was baptised 5 days after birth by the local archbishop in the local cathedral; Emperor Franz I of Austria, the former Holy Roman Emperor, acted as his godfather, but his uncle Archduke Ferdinand acted as proxy for the emperor.

In 1826 Francis IV of Modena appointed Count Clemente Coronini as tutor to Francis, with Don Pietro Raffaelli, who would later become Bishop of Carpi and Reggio, as his assistant. In 1829, Baron Ernest Geramb became Francis' new tutor.

On 15 September 1836, Francis became a Knight of the Austrian Order of the Golden Fleece, and 3 years later he received the Grand Cordon of the Dutch Order of the Lion.

After the death of his mother in 1840, Francis was considered the legitimate heir to the thrones of England, Scotland and Ireland by Jacobites as Francis I. At his death his younger brother's daughter Maria Theresia of Austria-Este became Jacobite claimant.

On 30 March 1842, Francis married Princess Adelgunde of Bavaria, daughter of King Ludwig I of Bavaria, in the Allerheiligen-Hofkirche at the Munich Residenz. The Archbishop of Munich-Freising was the chief officiant of the wedding. The couple had only one child, Princess Anna Beatrice (19 October 1848 in Gries, Bolzano – 8 July 1849 in Modena).

In 1842, Francis received another order: the Savoy Supreme Order of the Most Holy Annunciation.

At the death of his father Francis IV of Modena on 21 January 1846, Francis succeeded as reigning Duke of Modena. As member of a cadet branch of the House of Habsburg-Lorraine he also bore the titles of an Archduke of Austria and a Prince Royal of Hungary and Bohemia from birth; from his father he inherited also the title of Duke of Reggio and Mirandola, Duke of Massa, Prince of Carrara and Lunigiana. At the death of his cousin the Empress Marie-Louise on 18 December 1847, he succeeded as Duke of Guastalla.

During the revolutions of 1848, Francis was forced to flee his Duchy by a popular uprising and was restored by Austrian troops in the following year.

In 1855, Francis established his own new order: the Order of the Eagle of Este, of which he acted as Grand Master.

In 1859 the Duchy of Modena was invaded by armies of France and Piedmont. On 14 June, Francis fled. On 18 March 1860, King Victor Emanuel II of Sardinia ordered Modena to be incorporated into the new kingdom of Italy. Francis protested against this four days later.

After the loss of his duchy, Francis withdrew to Vienna, where he lived in the Palais Modena. He also had a summer residence at Schloss Wildenwart in Bavaria. Although he spent most of his time in Austria he occasionally traveled and in 1864 he visited the Middle East.

On 7 March 1861, William Ewart Gladstone, the British Chancellor of the Exchequer, made a verbal attack against Francis in the House of Commons, primarily accusing Francis of having violated criminal procedure by imposing excessive punishments. Constantine Phipps, Marquis of Normanby published a book later that year rebutting all of Gladstone's charges against Francis.

Francis died at Vienna on 20 November 1875. He left most of his huge estate to his 1st cousin twice removed Archduke Franz Ferdinand of Austria, who subsequently used the title Archduke of Austria-Este. His remains were kept at the Capuchin Church in Vienna.

Ancestors

References

Bibliography
Giornale della Reale Ducale Brigata Estense, Ristampa anastatica Aedes Muratoriana, Modena 1977
Gian Carlo Montanari, I Fedelissimi del Duca – La Brigata Estense, Edizioni il Fiorino, Modena 1995
Elena Bianchini Braglia, In esilio con il Duca, Il Cerchio Iniziative Editoriali, Rimini 2007. 
Nicola Guerra, "I filoestensi apuani durante il processo di unita' nazionale" in Rassegna storica Toscana, 2003

External links

1819 births
1875 deaths
House of Habsburg
Austria-Este
Austrian princes
Dukes of Italy
Dukes of Modena
Hereditary Princes of Modena
Modenese princes
Dukes of Reggio
Dukes of Massa
Dukes of Guastalla
Francis 1
Roman Catholic monarchs
Knights of the Golden Fleece of Austria
Grand Crosses of the Order of Saint Stephen of Hungary
Burials at the Imperial Crypt